Edricus is a genus of orb-weaver spiders first described by O. Pickard-Cambridge in 1890.  it contains only two species.

References

Araneidae
Araneomorphae genera
Spiders of Central America
Spiders of Mexico